Gabriel Pereira da Silva (born 18 January 1997), commonly known as Gabriel Pereira, is a Brazilian professional footballer who plays as a forward.

Career statistics

Club

Notes

References

1997 births
Living people
Brazilian footballers
Brazilian expatriate footballers
Association football forwards
Fluminense FC players
Esporte Clube Vitória players
Fortaleza Esporte Clube players
Boa Esporte Clube players
Académico de Viseu F.C. players
OFC Pirin Blagoevgrad players
Campeonato Brasileiro Série B players
Campeonato Brasileiro Série A players
Liga Portugal 2 players
Second Professional Football League (Bulgaria) players
Brazilian expatriate sportspeople in Portugal
Expatriate footballers in Portugal
Brazilian expatriate sportspeople in Bulgaria
Expatriate footballers in Bulgaria
People from Campo Grande
Sportspeople from Mato Grosso do Sul